In Euclidean geometry, the medial triangle or midpoint triangle of a triangle  is the triangle with vertices at the midpoints of the triangle's sides . It is the  case of the midpoint polygon of a polygon with  sides.

Each side of the medial triangle is called a midsegment (or midline). In general, a midsegment of a triangle is a line segment which joins the midpoints of two sides of the triangle. It is parallel to the third side and has a length  equal to half the length of the third side.

Properties

The medial triangle can also be viewed as the image of triangle  transformed by a homothety centered at the centroid with ratio -1/2. Thus, the sides of the medial triangle are half and parallel to the corresponding sides of triangle ABC. Hence, the medial triangle is inversely similar and shares the same centroid and medians with triangle . It also follows from this that the perimeter of the medial triangle equals the semiperimeter of triangle , and that the area is one quarter of the area of triangle . Furthermore, the four triangles that the original triangle is subdivided into by the medial triangle are all mutually congruent by SSS, so their areas are equal and thus the area of each is 1/4 the area of the original triangle.

The orthocenter of the medial triangle coincides with the circumcenter of triangle . This fact provides a tool for proving collinearity of the circumcenter, centroid and orthocenter. The medial triangle is the pedal triangle of the circumcenter. The nine-point circle circumscribes the medial triangle, and so the nine-point center is the circumcenter of the medial triangle.

The Nagel point of the medial triangle is the incenter of its reference triangle.

A reference triangle's medial triangle is congruent to the triangle whose vertices are the midpoints between the reference triangle's orthocenter and its vertices.

The incenter of a triangle lies in its medial triangle.

A point in the interior of a triangle is the center of an inellipse of the triangle if and only if the point lies in the interior of the medial triangle.

The medial triangle is the only inscribed triangle for which none of the other three interior triangles has smaller area.

The reference triangle and its medial triangle are orthologic triangles.

Coordinates
Let  be the sidelengths of triangle .  Trilinear coordinates for the vertices of the medial triangle are given by

Anticomplementary triangle

Trilinear coordinates for the vertices of the anticomplementary triangle, are given by

The name "anticomplementary triangle" corresponds to the fact that its vertices are the anticomplements of the vertices  of the reference triangle.

See also
Middle hedgehog, an analogous concept for more general convex sets

References

External links 

 
 

Elementary geometry
Objects defined for a triangle

de:Mittelparallele#Mittelparallelen eines Dreiecks